Ralf Akoto (born 31 January 1974) is a German judoka.

Achievements

See also
History of martial arts
Martial arts timeline
Outline of martial arts

References

External links
 

1974 births
Living people
German male judoka
20th-century German people
Place of birth missing (living people)